James Henry Winters, Jr. (April 29, 1899 – December 12, 1971), nicknamed "Nip" and "Jesse", was a pitcher in Negro league baseball, playing for many top eastern teams from 1920 to 1933, and considered one of the top left-handed pitchers of his day.

At age 53, Winters received votes listing him on the 1952 Pittsburgh Courier player-voted poll of the Negro leagues' best players ever.

References

External links
 and Baseball-Reference Black Baseball stats and Seamheads
 

Bacharach Giants players
Baltimore Black Sox players
Harrisburg Giants players
Hilldale Club players
Homestead Grays players
Lincoln Giants players
Newark Browns players
Philadelphia Stars players
Washington Pilots players
Baseball players from Washington, D.C.
1899 births
1971 deaths
20th-century African-American sportspeople
Baseball pitchers